"Mouth Breather" is a 1990 song by American rock band The Jesus Lizard from the album Goat.

Track listing
 "Mouth Breather" (Denison, McNeilly, Sims, Yow)
 "Sunday You Need Love" (Krawinkel, Remmler)

Accolades 

(*) designates unordered lists.

Personnel
David Yow – vocals
Duane Denison – guitar
David Wm. Sims – bass
Mac McNeilly – drums

References

External links
 

1990 songs
1990 singles
The Jesus Lizard songs